E1 series may refer to:

E1 series (preferred numbers), a series of standardized resistor and capacitor values
E1 series (train), a Japanese Shinkansen train since 1994

See also
E1 (disambiguation)